The list of ship launches in 1676 includes a chronological list of some ships launched in 1676.


References

1676
Ship launches